Carlisle Township is one of the eighteen townships of Lorain County, Ohio, United States. As of the 2010 census the population was 7,500.

Geography
Located in central Lorain County, it borders the following townships and cities:
Elyria Township - north, west of Elyria city
Elyria - north, east of Elyria Township
Eaton Township - east
Grafton - southeast
LaGrange Township - south
Pittsfield Township - southwest corner
New Russia Township - west
Amherst Township - northwest corner

The unincorporated community of Brentwood Lake lies in far eastern Carlisle Township.

Name and history
It is the only Carlisle Township statewide.

Carlisle Township was established in 1822.

Government
The township is governed by a three-member board of trustees, who are elected in November of odd-numbered years to a four-year term beginning on the following January 1. Two are elected in the year after the presidential election and one is elected in the year before it. There is also an elected township fiscal officer, who serves a four-year term beginning on April 1 of the year after the election, which is held in November of the year before the presidential election. Vacancies in the fiscal officership or on the board of trustees are filled by the remaining trustees.

References

External links

County website

1822 establishments in Ohio
Populated places established in 1822
Townships in Lorain County, Ohio
Townships in Ohio